Frank Magid (September 1, 1931, Chicago, Illinois — February 5, 2010, Santa Barbara, California) was an American marketing consultant, widely known for introducing the "Action News" format of evening local TV news, and was an original developer of Good Morning America. Time magazine named Magid "the nation's leading television news doctor" in 1977, and he became the namesake of the term "Magidized".

After serving in the Army during the Korean War, Magid earned his undergraduate and graduate degrees from the University of Iowa, paying his tuition and living expenses with proceeds from the GI Bill and a variety of part-time jobs.

While in an organic chemistry class, he met Marilyn Young, a chemistry major from Waterloo, Iowa. The two wed in 1956, and moved to Cedar Rapids, Iowa, where his wife had taken a job as a junior high science teacher. While a junior professor of social psychology, anthropology and statistics at the University of Iowa and Coe College, Magid launched his own company, Frank N. Magid Associates in 1956, selling his first research study to Merchants National Bank in Cedar Rapids.

A year later, he left teaching to devote his full efforts to the fledgling business. He built the company into the world's largest research-based strategy consulting company focused on media, entertainment and communications, which it remains. Media executives and on-air personalities frequently noted that the face of television was largely created not in the media centers of New York and Los Angeles, but in Marion, Iowa, where the company was based. Magid retired as CEO of Frank N. Magid Associates in 2002 and was succeeded by his son, Brent, but remained chairman of the company until his death.

Frank Magid died, aged 78, from lymphoma in Santa Barbara, California. He was survived by his wife, two sons, four grandchildren and a brother.

References

External links
 Cedar Rapids Gazette obituary
 Frank N. Magid Associates

1931 births
2010 deaths
American entertainment industry businesspeople
United States Army personnel of the Korean War
Deaths from cancer in California
Deaths from lymphoma
People from Cedar Rapids, Iowa
Businesspeople from Chicago
People from Santa Barbara, California
University of Iowa alumni
University of Iowa faculty
Coe College faculty
20th-century American businesspeople